T. K. Chathunni is an Indian football coach and a former player from Chalakudy, Kerala . He has managed most of football clubs in India like FC Kochin, Dempo S.C., Salgaocar F.C., Mohun Bagan A.C., Churchill Brothers S.C., Chirag United Club Kerala, Josco FC etc. He was the coach for various clubs in the National Football League (India) from 1997–98. He represented both Kerala and Goa in the Santosh Trophy.

Honours

Manager

Salgaocar
Federation Cup: 1997

Mohun Bagan
National Football League: 1997–98

References

Living people
Malayali people
Footballers from Thrissur
Indian football managers
Indian football coaches
Indian footballers
India international footballers
Association footballers not categorized by position
Year of birth missing (living people)